Alexandra Röseler is a German operatic mezzo-soprano and pianist. She won the 1988 Klassik Stiftung Weimar. After a period studying at the University of Magdeburg from 1992, she began a career as a concert pianist, performing for example Schumann's Piano Concerto. By the late 1990s, she had furthered her studies, studying vocal performance under Regina Werner at the University of Music and Theatre Leipzig. Röseler has since appeared in numerous recordings and recitals of baroque music as a mezzo-soprano and alto and has performed regularly with the Thomanerchor. In 2003 she recorded Bach's cantata, O heilges Geist- und Wasserbad, BWV 165, with Gotthold Schwarz, Thomanerchor, Gewandhausorchester, Heike Kumlin and Martin Krumbiegel, singing the alto part.

References

External links
Official site 

German operatic mezzo-sopranos
German contraltos
Living people
Bach singers
Musicians from Leipzig
German classical pianists
German women pianists
Year of birth missing (living people)
Place of birth missing (living people)
University of Music and Theatre Leipzig alumni
Women classical pianists